Ilarion Buiuc (born 1891, date of death unknown) was a Moldovan deputy elected by the Moldovan Military Congress in the Moldovan Parliament.

Biography 
He served as Member of the Moldovan Parliament (1917–1918). On March 27, 1918, he voted for the unification of Bessarabia with Romania.

Gallery

Bibliography 
Gheorghe E. Cojocaru, Sfatul Țării: itinerar, Civitas, Chişinău, 1998, 
Mihai Taşcă, Sfatul Țării şi actualele autorităţi locale, "Timpul de dimineaţă", no. 114 (849), June 27, 2008 (page 16)

External links 
 Arhiva pentru Sfatul Tarii
 Deputaţii Sfatului Ţării şi Lavrenti Beria

Notes

Moldovan MPs 1917–1918
1891 births
Year of death missing